Melissomorpha is a genus of horse flies in the family Tabanidae.

Distribution
India.

Species
Melissomorpha indiana Ricardo, 1906

References

Brachycera genera
Tabanidae
Diptera of Asia